PPRM may refer to:

 Positive Polarity Reed-Muller: representation of a boolean function as a single algebraic sum (xor) of one or more conjunctions of one or more literals
 Greater Romania Party